The 1944 United States presidential election in Tennessee took place on November 7, 1944, as part of the 1944 United States presidential election. Tennessee voters chose 12 representatives, or electors, to the Electoral College, who voted for president and vice president.

Tennessee was won by incumbent President Franklin D. Roosevelt (D–New York), running with Senator Harry S. Truman, with 60.45% of the popular vote, against New York Governor Thomas E. Dewey (R), running with Ohio Governor John Bricker, with 39.22% of the popular vote.

Results

Results by county

References

Tennessee
1944
1944 Tennessee elections